Mladen Jutrić (born 19 April 1996) is a Bosnian football player who plays as a centre back. In his career, Jutrić also played for teams such as SV Grödig, Kapfenberger SV or Doxa Katokopias, among others.

Club career
He made his Austrian Football First League debut for Kapfenberger SV on 21 July 2017 in a game against Liefering.

References

External links
 
 

1996 births
Living people
People from Derventa
Bosnia and Herzegovina footballers
Austrian footballers
Bosnia and Herzegovina emigrants to Austria
Serbs of Bosnia and Herzegovina
Austrian people of Bosnia and Herzegovina descent
Austrian people of Serbian descent
FC Red Bull Salzburg players
SV Grödig players
Kapfenberger SV players
SV Seekirchen players
Ehime FC players
Doxa Katokopias FC players
LPS HD Clinceni players
2. Liga (Austria) players
Austrian Regionalliga players
J2 League players
Cypriot First Division players
Liga I players
Association football defenders
Bosnia and Herzegovina expatriate footballers
Austrian expatriate footballers
Austrian expatriate sportspeople in Cyprus
Austrian expatriate sportspeople in Romania
Expatriate footballers in Japan
Expatriate footballers in Cyprus
Expatriate footballers in Romania